Psychoneuroendocrinology is the clinical study of hormone fluctuations and their relationship to human behavior.  It may be viewed from the perspective of psychiatry, where in certain mood disorders, there are associated neuroendocrine or hormonal changes affecting the brain.  It may also be viewed from the perspective of endocrinology, where certain endocrine disorders can be associated with negative health outcomes and psychiatric illness. Brain dysfunctions associated with the hypothalamus-pituitary-adrenal axis HPA axis can affect the endocrine system, which in turn can result in physiological and psychological symptoms. This complex blend of psychiatry, psychology, neurology, biochemistry, and endocrinology is needed to comprehensively understand and treat symptoms related to the brain, endocrine system (hormones), and psychological health. (see neurobiological brain disorder).

Disorders

Premenstrual Syndrome (PMS) and Premenstrual Dysphoric Disorder
Premenstrual syndrome is a mood disorder which occurs recurrently in the late luteal phase of the menstrual cycle and remits within the first day or two after the onset of menstruation.  Symptoms include depression, irritability, anxiety, insomnia, bloating, breast tenderness, cramping, and headaches.  About 5-9% of women of child-bearing age meet the DSM-IV criteria for PMDD.  In some women, end-of-cycle worsening actually represents "menstrual magnification" of an underlying mood disorder.

Premenstrual dysphoric disorder can be treated cyclically with hormonal oral contraceptives, or with antidepressants, which may be used continuously or only during the late luteal phase.  Selective serotonin reuptake inhibitors, or SSRIs, have been found to be effective in the treatment of PMDD.  Physical symptoms can be affected by the intake of caffeine, salt, alcohol, and nicotine, so the use of these substances should be monitored and potentially decreased.  Sleep hygiene measures, exercise, relaxation therapy, and cognitive behavioral therapy are all potentially effective non-medication strategies for milder symptoms.

Postpartum Depression (PPD)
Postpartum psychiatric disorders typically divided into three categories: (1) postpartum blues (2) postpartum depression and (3) postpartum psychosis. It may be useful to conceptualize these disorders as existing along a continuum, where postpartum blues is the mildest and postpartum psychosis the most severe form of postpartum psychiatric illness.

Up to 85% of women experience postpartum blues during the first two weeks after delivery. Symptoms include tearfulness, mood lability, irritability, and anxiety. These symptoms typically peak between postpartum days 5–7, and remit spontaneously within two weeks postpartum, so active treatment is not required.

Postpartum depression refers to a major depressive episode occurring following childbirth.  While women can become depressed at different points in time following childbirth, the "postpartum-onset" specifier in the DSM-IV-TR is applied for depression with onset in the first four weeks post-partum.  The risk of postpartum depression is increased by depression during pregnancy, or a history of postpartum depression.  The Edinburgh Postnatal Depression Scale is a 10-item questionnaire that may be used to identify women who have PPD. On this scale, a score of 12 or greater or an affirmative answer on question 10 (presence of suicidal thoughts) raise concern and indicate a need for more thorough evaluation.

Treatment of postpartum depression can include individual or group psychotherapy, medication, and supportive interventions.  A combination of individual psychotherapy (particularly cognitive therapy) and medication has been shown to be effective.  There are no standard guidelines regarding medication therapy.  The potential risk of infant exposure to small amounts of antidepressants in breast milk is unclear, so in each individual woman the risk of not taking antidepressants must be balanced against the risk of either not breastfeeding or potentially exposing the infant with continued breastfeeding.  There is some reassuring data on the safety of SSRI antidepressants, and infants nursed by mothers taking SSRIS typically receive low levels of medication exposure.

Postpartum Psychosis
Postpartum psychosis is the most severe form of postpartum psychiatric illness. It is a rare event that occurs in approximately 1 to 2 per 1000 women after childbirth. Its presentation is often dramatic, with onset of symptoms as early as the first 48 to 72 hours after delivery. The majority of women with puerperal psychosis develop symptoms within the first two postpartum weeks.

Symptoms include mood lability, agitation, confusion, thought disorganization, hallucinations, and disturbed sleep.  The risk of developing postpartum psychosis is increased by a history of bipolar disorder, previous episodes of postpartum psychosis, a family  history of bipolar disorder, and the current pregnancy being a woman's first.  Consequences of postpartum psychosis can be significant, including suicide, infant neglect, and infanticide, so women with this condition are generally hospitalized.  Acute treatment includes the use of a mood stabilizer, and antipsychotic, and if necessary a benzodiazepine for agitation.

References

External links
 

Neuroendocrinology
Causes of mental disorders
Endocrinology
Gynaecology
Mood disorders